Vargmåne is the debut studio album by Swedish rock artist Ulf Lundell. It was released in September 1975 on Harvest. It was recorded in EMI Studio, Stockholm and produced by Björn Boström. Vargmåne was released in 1992 on CD and released again in 2000 in a remastered edition with two bonus tracks that Lundell recorded with a 4-track Tandberg Sound On Sound. The only music Lundell didn't write himself on the record is "Jag går på promenaden" which is the John Mayall song "Walking on Sunset". Vargmåne sold gold in Sweden.

Track listing
All songs by Ulf Lundell, except where noted:
Side one
Stockholms City - 4:01
Då kommer jag och värmer dej - 3:04
Sniglar och krut - 3:35
Sextisju, sextisju - 5:09
När duellen är över - 3:06

Side two
Jag går på promenaden (Mayall - sv. text: Lundell) - 3:18
Bente - 5:16
Jesse James möter kärleken - 5:55
Nu har jag förpackat min längtan - 3:05

Personnel 

 Ulf Lundell – vocals
 Wojciech Ernest – piano
 Finn Sjöberg – guitar
 Jan Bergman – bass guitar
 Mike Watson – bass guitar
 Ola Brunkert – drums
 Roger Palm – drums
 Mats Ronander – harmonica
 Ulf Andersson – tenor saxophone, flute

Production

 Björn Boström – producer
 Björn Norén – engineer
 Lars Rosin – engineer

Artwork

 Joakim Strömholm – photography

Charts

References

External links 

 

1975 debut albums
Ulf Lundell albums